Body odor or body odour (BO) is present in all animals and its intensity can be influenced by many factors (behavioral patterns, survival strategies). Body odor has a strong genetic basis, but can also be strongly influenced by various diseases and physiological conditions. Though body odor has played an important role (and continues to do so in many life forms) in early humankind, it is generally considered to be an unpleasant odor amongst many human cultures.

Causes

In humans, the formation of body odors is caused by factors such as diet, sex, health, and medication, but the major contribution comes from bacterial activity on skin gland secretions. Humans have three types of sweat glands: eccrine sweat glands, apocrine sweat glands and sebaceous glands. Eccrine sweat glands are present from birth, while the latter two become activated during puberty. Among the different types of human skin glands, body odor is primarily the result of the apocrine sweat glands, which secrete the majority of chemical compounds that the skin flora metabolize into odorant substances. This happens mostly in the axillary (armpit) region, although the gland can also be found in the areola, anogenital region, and around the navel. In humans, the armpit regions seem more important than the genital region for body odor, which may be related to human bipedalism. The genital and armpit regions also contain springy hairs which help diffuse body odors.

The main components of human axillary odor are unsaturated or hydroxylated branched fatty acids with E-3M2H (E-3-methylhex-2-enoic acid) and HMHA (3-hydroxy-3-methylhexanoic acid), sulfanylalkanols and particularly 3M3SH (3-methyl-3-sulfanylhexan-1-ol), and the odoriferous steroids androstenone (5α-androst-16-en-3-one) and androstenol (5α-androst-16-en-3α-ol). E-3M2H is bound and carried by two apocrine secretion odor-binding proteins, ASOB1 and ASOB2, to the skin surface.

Body odor is influenced by the actions of the skin flora, including members of Corynebacterium, which manufacture enzymes called lipases that break down the lipids in sweat to create smaller molecules like butyric acid. Greater bacteria populations of Corynebacterium jeikeium are found more in the armpits of men, whereas greater population numbers of Staphylococcus haemolyticus are found in the armpits of women. This causes male armpits to give off a rancid/cheese-like smell, whereas female armpits give off a more fruity/onion-like smell. Staphylococcus hominis is also known for producing thioalcohol compounds that contribute to odors. These smaller molecules smell, and give body odor its characteristic aroma. Propionic acid (propanoic acid) is present in many sweat samples. This acid is a breakdown product of some amino acids by propionibacteria, which thrive in the ducts of adolescent and adult sebaceous glands. Because propionic acid is chemically similar to acetic acid, with similar characteristics including odor, body odors may be identified as having a pungent, cheesy and vinegar-like smell although certain people might find it pleasant at lower concentrations. Isovaleric acid (3-methyl butanoic acid) is the other source of body odor as a result of actions of the bacteria Staphylococcus epidermidis, which is also present in several types of strong cheese.

Factors such as food, drink, gut microbiome  and diseases can affect body odor, as can lifestyle and genetics.

Function

Animals
In many animals, body odor plays an important survival function. Strong body odor can be a warning signal for predators to stay away (such as porcupine stink), or it can also be a signal that the prey animal is unpalatable. For example, some animals species, who feign death to survive (like opossums), in this state produce a strong body odor to deceive a predator that the prey animal has been dead for a long time and is already in the advanced stage of decomposing. Some animals with strong body odor are rarely attacked by most predators, although they can still be killed and eaten by birds of prey, which are tolerant of carrion odors.

Body odor is an important feature of animal physiology. It plays a different role in different animal species. For example, in some predator species that hunt by stalking (such as big and small cats), the absence of body odor is important, and they spend plenty of time and energy to keep their body free of odor. For other predators, such as those that hunt by visually locating prey and running for long distances after it (such as dogs and wolves), the absence of body odor is not critical. In most animals, body odor intensifies in moments of stress and danger.

Humans

In humans, body odor serves as a means of chemosensory signal communication between members of the species. These signals are called pheromones and they can be transmitted through a variety of mediums. The most common way that human pheromones are transmitted is through bodily fluids. Human pheromones are contained in sweat, semen, vaginal secretions, breast milk, and urine.  The signals carried in these fluids serve a range of functions from reproductive signaling to infant socialization. Each person produces a unique spread of pheromones that can be identified by others. This differentiation allows the formation of sexual attraction and kinship ties to occur.

Sebaceous and apocrine glands become active at puberty. This, as well as many apocrine glands being close to the sex organs, points to a role related to mating. Sebaceous glands line the human skin while apocrine glands are located around body hairs. Compared to other primates, humans have extensive axillary hair and have many odor producing sources, in particular many apocrine glands. In humans, the apocrine glands have the ability to secrete pheromones. These steroid compounds are produced within the peroxisomes of the apocrine glands by enzymes such as mevalonate kinases.

Sexual selection 
Pheromones are a factor seen in the mating selection and reproduction in humans. In women, the sense of olfaction is strongest around the time of ovulation, significantly stronger than during other phases of the menstrual cycle and also stronger than the sense in males. Pheromones can be used to deliver information about the major histocompatibility complex (MHC).   The MCH in humans is referred to as the Human Leukocyte Antigen (HLA). Each type has a unique scent profile that can be utilized during the mating selection process. When selecting mates, women tend to be attracted to those that have different HLA-types than their own.  This is thought to increase the strength of the family unit and increase the chances of survival for potential offspring.

Studies have suggested that people might be using odor cues associated with the immune system to select mates. Using a brain-imaging technique, Swedish researchers have shown that homosexual and heterosexual males' brains respond in different ways to two odors that may be involved in sexual arousal, and that homosexual men respond in the same way as heterosexual women, though it could not be determined whether this was cause or effect. When the study was expanded to include lesbian women, the results were consistent with previous findings – meaning that lesbian women were not as responsive to male-identified odors, while responding to female odors in a similar way as heterosexual males. According to the researchers, this research suggests a possible role for human pheromones in the biological basis of sexual orientation.

Kinship communication 
Humans can olfactorily detect blood-related kin. Mothers can identify by body odor their biological children, but not their stepchildren. Preadolescent children can olfactorily detect their full siblings, but not half-siblings or step-siblings, and this might explain incest avoidance and the Westermarck effect. Babies can recognize their mothers by smell while mothers, fathers, and other relatives can identify a baby by smell. This connection between genetically similar family members is due to the habituation of familial pheromones. In the case of babies and mothers, this chemosensory information is primarily contained within breastmilk and the mother's sweat. When compared to that of strangers, babies are observed to have stronger neural connections with their mothers. This strengthened neurological connection allows for the biological development and socialization of the infant by their mother. Using these connections, the mother transmits olfactory signals to the infant which are then perceived and integrated.

In terms of biological functioning, olfactory signaling allows for functional breastfeeding to occur. In cases of effective latching, breastfed infants are able to locate their mother's nipples for feeding using the sensory information enclosed in their mother's body odor. While no specific human breast pheromones have been identified, studies compare the communication to that of the rabbit mammary pheromone 2MB2. The perception and integration of these signals is an evolutionary response that allows newborns to locate their source of nutrition. Signaling contains a level of precision that allows babies to differentiate their mother's breasts from that of other women. Once the baby recognizes the familiar olfactory signal, the behavioral response of latching follows. Over time the infant becomes habituated to their mother's breast pheromones which increases latch efficiency.

Beyond a biological function, a mother's body odor plays a role in developing a baby's social capabilities. The ability of an infant to evaluate the properties of human faces stems from the olfactory cues given from their mother. Frequent exposure to the pheromones exuded by their mother allows the connection between vision and smell to form in infants. This type of connection is only found between mothers and babies and overtime it socializes the ability to recognize the features that distinguish human faces from inanimate objects.

Environmental threats 
The connection between olfactory and visual cues has also been observed outside of familial relationships. Evolutionarily, body odor has been used to communicate messages about potentially dangerous stimuli in the environment.  Body odor produced during particularly stressful situations can produce a cascade of reactions in the brain. Once the olfactory system is activated by a threatening stimuli, heightened activity in the amygdala and occipital cortex is triggered.  This chain reaction serves to help assess the nature of the threat and increase chance of survival.

Humans have few olfactory receptor cells compared to dogs and few functional olfactory receptor genes compared to rats. This is in part due to a reduction of the size of the snout in order to achieve depth perception as well as other changes related to bipedalism. However, it has been argued that humans may have larger brain areas associated with olfactory perception compared to other species.

Genes affecting body odor

MHC 
Body odor is largely influenced by major histocompatibility complex (MHC) molecules. These are genetically determined and play an important role in immunity of the organism. The vomeronasal organ contains cells sensitive to MHC molecules in a genotype-specific way.

Experiments on animals and volunteers have shown that potential sexual partners tend to be perceived more attractive if their MHC composition is substantially different. Married couples are more different regarding MHC genes than would be expected by chance. This behavior pattern promotes variability of the immune system of individuals in the population, thus making the population more robust against new diseases. Another reason may be to prevent inbreeding.

ABCC11 
The ABCC11 gene determines axillary body odor and the type of earwax. The loss of a functional ABCC11 gene is caused by a 538G>A single-nucleotide polymorphism, resulting in a loss of body odor in people who are specifically homozygous for it. Firstly, it affects apocrine sweat glands by reducing secretion of odorous molecules and its precursors. The lack of ABCC11 function results in a decrease of the odorant compounds 3M2H, HMHA, and 3M3SH via a strongly reduced secretion of the precursor amino-acid conjugates 3M2H–Gln, HMHA–Gln, and Cys–Gly–(S) 3M3SH; and a decrease of the odoriferous steroids androstenone and androstenol, possibly due to the reduced levels and secretion of DHEAS and DHEA (possibly bacterial substrates for odoriferous steroids). Secondly, it is also associated with a strongly reduced/atrophic size of apocrine sweat glands and a decreased protein (such as ASOB2) concentration in axillary sweat.

The non-functional ABCC11 allele is predominant among East Asians (80–95%), but very low in other ancestral groups (0–3%). Most of the world's population has the gene that codes for the wet-type earwax and average body odor; however, East Asians are more likely to inherit the allele associated with the dry-type earwax and a reduction in body odor. The hypothesized reduction in body odor may be due to adaptation to colder climates by their ancient Northeast Asian ancestors.

However, research has observed that this allele is not solely responsible for ethnic differences in scent. A 2016 study analyzed differences across ethnicities in volatile organic compounds (VOCs), across racial groups and found that while they largely did not differ significantly qualitatively, they did differ quantitatively. Of the observed differences, they were found to vary with ethnic origin, but not entirely with ABCC11 genotype.

One large study failed to find any significant differences across ethnicity in residual compounds on the skin, including those located in sweat. If there were observed ethnic variants in skin odor, one would find sources to be much more likely in diet, hygiene, microbiome, and other environmental factors.

Research has indicated a strong association between people with axillary osmidrosis and the ABCC11-genotypes GG or GA at the SNP site (rs17822931) in comparison to the genotype AA.

* ND indicates that no detectable peak is found on the [M+H]+ ion trace of the selected analyte at the correct retention time. * HMHA: 3-hydroxy-3-methyl-hexanoic acid; 3M2H: (E)-3-methyl-2-hexenoic acid; 3M3SH: 3-methyl-3-sulfanylhexan-1-ol.

Alterations
Body odor may be reduced or prevented or even aggravated by using deodorants, antiperspirants, disinfectants, underarm liners, triclosan, special soaps or foams with antiseptic plant extracts such as ribwort and liquorice, chlorophyllin ointments and sprays topically, and chlorophyllin supplements internally. Although body odor is commonly associated with hygiene practices, its presentation can be affected by changes in diet as well as the other factors. Skin spectrophotometry analysis found that males who consumed more fruits and vegetables were significantly associated with more pleasant smelling sweat, which was described as "floral, fruity, sweet and medicinal qualities".

Industry
As many as 90% of Americans and 92% of teenagers use antiperspirants or deodorants. In 2014, the global market for deodorants was estimated at US$13.00 billion with a compound annual growth rate of 5.62% between 2015 and 2020.

Medical conditions
Osmidrosis or bromhidrosis is defined by a foul odor due to a water-rich environment that supports bacteria, which is caused by an abnormal increase in perspiration (hyperhidrosis). This can be particularly strong when it happens in the axillary region (underarms). In this case, the condition may be referred to as axillary osmidrosis. The condition can also be known medically as apocrine bromhidrosis, ozochrotia, fetid sweat, body smell, or malodorous sweating.

Trimethylaminuria (TMAU), also known as fish odor syndrome or fish malodor syndrome, is a rare metabolic disorder where trimethylamine is released in the person's sweat, urine, and breath, giving off a strong fishy odor or strong body odor.

See also 

 Drug resistance
 Foot odor
 Halitosis (bad breath)
 Old person smell
 Olfactophilia
 Olfactory fatigue
 Pheromone
 Sweat gland

References

External links 
 
 

Animal physiology
 
Hygiene
Immunology